Matthew Jenkinson (31 October 1906 – 4 August 1979), also known as Sailor Jenkinson, was an English professional footballer who played as an outside forward or an inside forward in the Football League for York City and in non-League football for Scarborough and Filey Town.

References

1906 births
1979 deaths
People from Filey
Footballers from Yorkshire
English footballers
Association football forwards
Scarborough F.C. players
York City F.C. players
Filey Town F.C. players
Midland Football League players
English Football League players